The Gauliga Danzig-Westpreußen was the highest football league in the former Reichsgau Danzig-West Prussia (German: Danzig-Westpreußen), a Nazi administrative unit established partly from German and partly from annexed territory.

Overview
The Nazi occupants had merged the German-annexed territories of the Free City of Danzig (a free city under the League of Nations) and of the Polish Pomeranian Voivodeship (Polish: Województwo Pomorskie) and the German Marienwerder Region in a Reichsgau, a kind of paramount Nazi administrative region. Historically, the area had belonged to Poland and Prussia, changing hands several times.

After the formation of the Reichsgau on 26 October 1939, the league formed the highest level of play in the Reichsgau introduced by the Nazi Sports Office for the sport season starting in 1940. Since the reorganisation of the league districts in 1933 football teams from places in the Free City of Danzig and the Marienwerder Region (called West Prussia Region between 1922 and 1939, not to be confused with the homonymous province dissolved in 1920) used to play in the Gauliga Ostpreußen-Danzig. Earlier the football clubs from places in the Free City formed a league with those from places in the Prussian Province of Grenzmark Posen-West Prussia. In 1940 the Gauliga Ostpreußen-Danzig skipped the addition Danzig from its name and comprised only teams from East Prussia in its then borders.

Until 1939 also clubs of Polish identity, such as Gedania Danzig, comprising many, but not only, Danzigers of Polish tongue, played in the Gauliga Ostpreußen-Danzig and qualified for the play-offs of the Ostpreußen-Danzig gauliga championships. However the Danzig Senate had forbidden Gedania Danzig on 31 August 1939. Under Nazi occupation no clubs of Polish identity were allowed. Football in the Pomeranian voivodeship had been part of the Polish league system until the war.

The Gauliga Danzig-Westpreußen was established with six clubs in a single divisions. Originally, the league only consisted of clubs from the region of Danzig and Marienwerder, only from 1942 did clubs from German-annexed Polish Thorn and Bromberg enter the competition, too. Teams  played each other once at home and once away. The league champion then qualified for the German championship. The 1941/1942 season was played with ten clubs and two relegated teams. In 1942/1943, the league was reduced to nine teams but returned to its former strength the season after.

The imminent collapse of Nazi Germany in 1945 gravely affected all Gauligas and football in Danzig-West Prussia ceased in 1944. The 1944/1945 season may not have been started at all anymore. It was scheduled to operate on the same system as the year before.

Aftermath
With the end of the Nazi era, the Gauligas ceased to exist. West Prussia and Danzig came under Soviet control. The region then became a part of Poland again. The German population was almost completely expelled from the region. All German football clubs were dissolved.

Founding members of the league
The six founding members and their positions in the, incompleted, 1939/1940 Gauliga Ostpreußen season were:
 Preußen Danzig, 2nd Gauliga Ostpreußen
 VfR Hansa Elbing, not part of the Gauliga
 SV 19 Neufahrwasser, 5th Gauliga Ostpreußen
 SC Viktoria Elbing, not part of the Gauliga
 BuEV Danzig, 3rd Gauliga Ostpreußen
 Polizei SV Danzig, not part of the Gauliga

Winners and runners-up of the league
The winners and runners-up of the league:

Placings in the league 1940-44
The complete list of clubs competing in the league:

 1 Both teams started the 1942–43 season but dropped out  halfway through.

References

Sources
 Die deutschen Gauligen 1933-45 - Heft 1-3  Tables of the Gauligas 1933–45, publisher: DSFS
 Kicker Almanach,  The yearbook on German football from Bundesliga to Oberliga, since 1937, published by the Kicker Sports Magazine

External links
  The Gauligas Das Deutsche Fussball Archiv 
 Germany - Championships 1902-1945 at RSSSF.com
 Where's My Country? Article on cross-border movements of football clubs, at RSSSF.com

Sports leagues established in 1940
1940 establishments in Germany
1945 disestablishments in Germany
Gauliga
Sports competitions in Gdańsk
Football competitions in West Prussia
Defunct football competitions in Poland
1940 in Polish football
1941 in Polish football
1942 in Polish football
1943 in Polish football
1944 in Polish football
Football in occupied Poland (1939–1945)